The Center for Research on Antisemitism (ZfA) at the Technical University of Berlin is a research centre dedicated to researching antisemitism. It was founded in 1982.

References

External links 
Official webpage

Berlin
Technical University of Berlin